Papilio dardanus, the African swallowtail, mocker swallowtail or flying handkerchief, is a species of butterfly in the family Papilionidae (the swallowtails). The species is broadly distributed throughout Sub-Saharan Africa. The British entomologist E. B. Poulton described it as "the most interesting butterfly in the world".

Classification
Molecular studies have provided evidence that this species' closest relative is Papilio phorcas, with Papilio constantinus being the next closest (see images below). It is a member of the Papilio genus of which Papilio appalachiensis and Papilio xuthus are also members.

Papilio dardanus is the nominal member of the dardanus species group. The
members of the clade are:

Papilio dardanus Brown, 1776
Papilio constantinus Ward, 1871
Papilio delalandei Godart, [1824]
Papilio phorcas Cramer, [1775]
Papilio rex Oberthür, 1886

Subspecies
Listed alphabetically:
P. d. antinorii Oberthür, 1883  (highlands of Ethiopia)
P. d. byatti Poulton, 1926   (northern highlands of Somalia)
P. d. cenea Stoll, [1790]  (southern Mozambique, eastern Zimbabwe, Botswana, South Africa, Eswatini)
P. d. dardanus Brown, 1776 (Senegal, Guinea Bissau, Guinea, Sierra Leone, Liberia, Ivory Coast, Ghana, Burkina Faso, Togo, Benin, Nigeria, Cameroon, Equatorial Guinea, Gabon, Congo, Central African Republic, Angola, Democratic Republic of Congo, Uganda, western Kenya, northern Zambia)
P. d. figinii Storace, 1962 (highlands of Eritrea)
P. d. flavicornis Carpenter, 1947  (Mt Kulal, north-western Kenya)
P. d. humbloti Oberthür, 1888 (Comoro Islands)
P. d. meriones C. & R. Felder, 1865 (Madagascar)
P. d. meseres Carpenter, 1948  (Uganda, south-western Kenya, Tanzania: the western, southern and south-eastern shores of Lake Victoria)
P. d. ochraceana Vane-Wright 1995  (Mt. Marsabit, northern Kenya)
P. d. polytrophus Rothschild & Jordan, 1903 (Kenya: highlands east of the Rift Valley)
P. d. sulfurea Palisot de Beauvois, 1806    (São Tomé and Príncipe, Bioko)
P. d. tibullus Kirby, 1880   (eastern Kenya, eastern Tanzania, Malawi, Zambia)

Biogeographic realm
Afrotropical realm

Mimicry

The species shows polymorphism in wing appearance, though this is limited to females, which are often given as an example of Batesian mimicry in insects. This female-limited mimicry was first described in 1869 by Roland Trimen. Males have a more or less uniform appearance throughout the species' range, but females come in at least 14 varieties or morphs.

Some female morphs share a very similar pattern of colouration with various species of distasteful butterfly (e.g. from the Danainae, a subfamily of nymphalids), while others have been found that mimic male appearance (andromorphs). The persistence of these various morphs or different types of females may be explained by frequency dependent selection. Cook et al. suggest that Batesian mimics gain a fitness advantage by avoiding predators, but suffer harassment from males (see sexual conflict), whereas andromorphs (male mimics) are vulnerable to predation but are not harassed by male mating attempts.

Morphs are divided into three general groups based on patterning: the hippocoon group, the cenea group, and the planemoides group. The hippocoon group holds the largest amount of morphs; phenotypes within this group are characterized by four bands of alternating black and color patterns. Within the cenea group patterns are greatly dominated by black coloration and contain small splotches of color. The planemoides group has black bands surrounding the outside of the wing with a large splotch of color through the middle of the wing. This group also contains the female forms that are male-like mimics. Diversity in the wing patterns of each group is seen mostly in the coloration of each organism, while black patterns are generally consistent in each morph.

Phenotypic variation within the female morphs of Papilio dardanus has been found to be controlled at one locus named H that contains at least 11 different alleles. Recent studies have narrowed down the region of H to approximately 24 genes that is centered around the engrailed (en) gene which codes for specific transcription factors. The engrailed site has been found to have non-synonymous mutations throughout individuals in the species which would allow the divergence of each morph. Studies support that the engrailed gene in Papilio dardanus is monophyletic and has only evolved once within the species. Findings also suggest that the many different mimetic alleles in the Papilio dardanus genome are solely from mutations in the species. In other words, alleles did not enter into the genome from genetic transfer from other species.

Different combinations of the alleles at H lead to the variety of forms seen within the species. Genetic crosses of individuals found a general dominance hierarchy within the alleles. Allele combinations also determine not only which morph will be expressed but the actual size of the patterns shown.  Each allele is able to either influence a larger or smaller mimetic pattern in an organism.

Such female-limited Batesian mimicry is not unique to this species, even in the genus Papilio. For instance Papilio memnon shows a similar case of polymorphism in females. Similarly, male mimicry has been observed in another insect, a damselfly Ischnura ramburii which also appears to have evolved camouflage to avoid sexual coercion by males.

See also
Disruptive selection
Phylogenetics of mimicry
Supergene
Cyril Clarke, E. B. Ford and Philip Sheppard (some notable researchers)
Amauris mimetic model

Gallery

References

Carcasson, R.H. (1960). "The Swallowtail Butterflies of East Africa (Lepidoptera, Papilionidae)". Journal of the East Africa Natural History Society pdf Key to East Africa members of the species group, diagnostic and other notes and figures. (Permission to host granted by The East Africa Natural History Society)

External links

Photo showing mimetic morphs and their models
Photo of caterpillar
Most Spectacular Batesian Mimicry

dardanus
Butterflies of Africa
Butterflies described in 1776
Articles containing video clips
Taxa named by Peter Brown (naturalist)